Charles Cooke (born 14 October 1942) is a Scottish former footballer. He played as a winger for Aberdeen, Dundee, Chelsea and Crystal Palace, before ending his career in the United States.

Club career
Cooke began his professional career with Aberdeen in 1960 and moved to Dundee in December 1964, where he was voted player of the year. He signed for Chelsea in April 1966 for a then club record of £72,000 as part of manager Tommy Docherty's restructuring of the Chelsea side. He made his debut in May 1966 during a 2–0 Inter-Cities Fairs Cup win over FC Barcelona. On his league debut the following season against West Ham United, Cooke waltzed past England's World Cup-winning captain Bobby Moore en route to scoring the winner for Chelsea. Cooke took the place of Bert Murray on the right wing as several players were replaced owing to a growing rift between Docherty and his players. He proved a versatile player when the post World Cup tactics limited the use of wingers and he was often played in a deeper right midfield position behind Tommy Baldwin who had replaced George Graham in a direct swap between Chelsea and Arsenal. His debut season saw Chelsea reach the FA Cup final against Tottenham Hotspur (Cooke's cross had created Tony Hateley's winner for Chelsea in the semi-final against Leeds United). Cooke had a shot tipped over the bar by Pat Jennings early on, but Chelsea generally underperformed and lost 2–1.

In the early 1970s, Cooke was one of the star players in a flamboyant Chelsea side, alongside Peter Bonetti, Peter Osgood, Alan Hudson and Ian Hutchinson. They reached another FA Cup final, against Leeds United, in 1970. The first game ended 2–2 and, with Chelsea trailing 1–0 in the replay at Old Trafford with the clock running down, Cooke's run and chipped pass set up Osgood's equaliser with a diving header; Chelsea eventually won 2–1 after extra time. The Cup Winners' Cup was added in 1971 with a replayed win over Real Madrid in Athens. Chelsea reached a third consecutive cup final in 1972, this time the League Cup, and though Cooke again created the equaliser for Osgood, Chelsea lost to Stoke City.

He was sold to Crystal Palace shortly afterwards for £85,000 and made 44 appearances for the South London side, but returned to Chelsea a year later. By that stage, the club were in decline and were relegated in 1974–75, though Cooke's experience proved invaluable in helping manager and ex-teammate Eddie McCreadie's young side earn promotion again in 1976–77. In his two spells at Chelsea, Cooke made 373 appearances, scoring 30 goals.

Cooke left Chelsea for the second and final time in July 1978 to play for numerous American teams, including the Memphis Rogues, Los Angeles Aztecs and California Surf in the now-defunct NASL.

International career
He was a Scotland international, winning 16 caps. He made his debut in a 4–1 win over Wales in 1965 and played his final match in 1975 against Portugal.

Post-playing career
In 1980, he replaced his old Chelsea teammate, Eddie McCreadie, as the head coach of the Memphis Rogues. After new ownership moved the team to Calgary, Cooke himself moved to the California Surf where he played one last outdoor season. After this however, he continued to play in the indoor leagues, making his last appearance in the 1985–86 season for the Dallas Sidekicks.

He now runs a soccer school in Cincinnati, Ohio. In 2006, his autobiography The Bonnie Prince, written with Martin Knight, was published.

Statistics

Club

International

Honours
Chelsea
FA Cup: 1969–70
European Cup Winners' Cup: 1970–71

References

External links
 NASL/MISL stats
 Charlie Cooke, London Hearts Supporters' Club
 
 

1942 births
Living people
Footballers from Fife
Association football wingers
Scottish footballers
Aberdeen F.C. players
Calgary Boomers players
Chelsea F.C. players
Crystal Palace F.C. players
Dundee F.C. players
North American Soccer League (1968–1984) players
Los Angeles Aztecs players
Memphis Rogues players
California Surf players
Cleveland Force (original MISL) players
Dallas Sidekicks (original MISL) players
Scotland international footballers
North American Soccer League (1968–1984) indoor players
North American Soccer League (1968–1984) coaches
Scottish expatriate footballers
Scottish Football League players
Scottish Football League representative players
Scotland under-23 international footballers
Scottish expatriate sportspeople in the United States
Expatriate soccer players in the United States
Scottish expatriate sportspeople in Canada
Expatriate soccer players in Canada
Scottish football managers
People from St Monans
FA Cup Final players